The Moses Merrill Baptist Camp, near Fullerton, Nebraska, is a historic site dating to 1942. Also known as Broken Arrow Wilderness Area and Camp and denoted as NeHBS#NC00-002, it was listed on the National Register of Historic Places in 2004.
It was deemed significant for its association with religious history, being a summer camp site starting in 1942 for the Nebraska Baptist State Convention.  In 2003, it was known as Broken Arrow Wilderness and Camp.  It is located near the Cedar River.

References

External links 

More photos of the Broken Arrow Wilderness (Fullerton, Nebraska) at Wikimedia Commons

Buildings and structures completed in 1942
Nance County, Nebraska
Baptist churches in Nebraska
Historic districts on the National Register of Historic Places in Nebraska
1942 establishments in Nebraska
National Register of Historic Places in Nance County, Nebraska
Baptist organizations in the United States
Baptist Christianity in Nebraska